Blue 88 was a blue-colored pill that was a mix of calming drugs, mainly barbiturates such as sodium amytal,  used to treat American soldiers in the Second World War who suffered from battle fatigue. In most cases, it was used to induce sleep.

Use during World War II
A Public Broadcasting Service piece called "Battle of the Bulge" from the American Experience series which was broadcast in 1994 provided an overview of the use of this pharmaceutical. This documentary, produced by Boston, Massachusett's WGBH Educational Foundation, reviewed the pivotal World War II German offensive in the Ardennes of Belgium in 1944–1945. The following is a summary of the transcript that relates to this drug.

Because of increasing losses during the Ardennes Offensive, the Allied forces began to suffer from a shortage of soldiers. Those not severely wounded or suffering from battle fatigue were encouraged to return to the front lines. A 103rd Medical Battalion Special Troops dental officer of the 28th Infantry Division, Captain Ben Kimmelman, was active in the medical corps and witnessed the effects of the battle:

One out of four soldiers wounded during the "Battle of the Bulge" were classified as "psychiatric casualties". Captain Kimmelman continues:

Capt. Kimmelman was later captured along with parts of the 110th and 112th Infantry Regiments of the 28th Infantry Division.

See also
 Amobarbital
 Barbiturate

References

 
 
 

Barbiturates
Military medicine in World War II